DVD Talk is a home video news and review website launched in 1999 by Geoffrey Kleinman.

History 
Kleinman founded the site in January 1999 in Beaverton, Oregon.  Besides news and reviews, it features information on hidden DVD features known as "Easter eggs".  In 2000, posts to their forum led Amazon.com to cease the practice of dynamic pricing.  In 2007, the site was sold to Internet Brands.

Reception 
Shawn Levy of The Oregonian called it "worth a visit", and Randy Salas of the Star Tribune recommended it as a source of information for DVDs.  It was used at one time by industry insiders to gauge interest in DVD titles.

References

External links 
 

American film review websites
Internet properties established in 1999
1999 establishments in Oregon
2007 mergers and acquisitions